The 1954 German football championship was the culmination of the football season in the Federal Republic of Germany in 1953–54. Hannover 96 were crowned champions for the second time after a group stage and a final.

It was Hannover's second appearance in the German final, having previously won the championship in 1938, beating Schalke 04 4-3 after extra-time. Kaiserslautern were making their fourth appearance, and was the third time they had reached the final in four years, following their championship wins in 1951 and 1953.

The format used to determine the German champion was different from the 1953 season. Only six teams qualified for the championship, instead of eight. These six teams were split into two groups of three, and only played a single round of matches with games on neutral grounds; previously it had been home-and-away games. The reason for this format change and the reduction in the number of games was Germany's qualifying for the 1954 FIFA World Cup, held shortly after the championship final. As in the past seasons, the two group winners then played the national final.

Qualified teams
The teams qualified through the 1953–54 Oberliga season:

Competition

Group 1

Group 2

Final

Sources
 German Championship 1953-54 at Weltfussball.de
 Germany - Championship 1954 at RSSSF.com
 German championship 1954 at Fussballdaten.de

1954
1